Grewia glandulosa is a species of flowering plant in the family Malvaceae sensu lato or Tiliaceae or Sparrmanniaceae. It is found only in Seychelles. It is threatened by habitat loss.

References

glandulosa
Vulnerable plants
Endemic flora of Seychelles
Taxonomy articles created by Polbot